Sheikh Mohamed Abdirahman Kaariye was the Imam of the largest mosque in Portland, Oregon - Masjid As-Saber.

Kaariye's father was one of Somalia's most popular imams.

In 2014 he had been jailed, but Muslim crowds chanted "God is great" on the steps of the Federal courthouse here after prominent New York civil rights lawyer Stanley Cohen announced he had secured bail. Cohen and federal prosecutors reached an agreement that allowed for Kariye's release.

References

American imams
Clergy from Portland, Oregon
Year of birth missing (living people)
Living people